Melem-Ana of Unug (? -  2546 BC) was the 11th lugal of the First Dynasty of Uruk. He ruled in Mesopotamia in modern-day Iraq. Little is known about Melem-ana.

The Sumerian King List places him after Mesh-he and he would have ruled for 6 years. It is believed he died after the year 2552 BC. Whether Lugal-kitun succeeded him, however, is not completely established.

See also

History of Sumer

|-

Sumerian kings
26th-century BC Sumerian kings
Kings of Uruk